Monopis longella is a moth of the family Tineidae. It has been recorded from  China, Korea India, Japan, Malaysia, Philippines, Russia and Thailand and is an introduced species in North America, where it has been recorded from New York to central Florida and west to Michigan.

The larvae have been found tunnelling in the feathers and pupating just below the nest surface in a cylindrical cocoon of thin silk with adhering fragments of feathers.

Taxonomy
It has been placed as a synonym of Monopis monachella in the past.

External links
Gaedike. Some New and Interesting “Microlepidoptera” from the Collection of theZoologisches Forschungsmuseum Alexander Koenig (ZFMK), Bonn(Lepidoptera: Tineidae, Epermeniidae, Acrolepiidae, Douglasiidae)

References

Tineinae
Moths described in 1863